Statistics of Ekstraklasa for the 1948 season.

Overview
It was contested by 14 teams, and Cracovia won the championship.

League table

Results

Final
Cracovia 3-1 Wisła Kraków

Top goalscorers

References

External links
 Poland – List of final tables at RSSSF 
 List of Polish football championships 
 List of Polish football championships 

Ekstraklasa seasons
1
Pol
Pol